KGD may be:

 Khrabrovo Airport – an airport in Kaliningrad, Russia with the IATA airport code "KGD"
 King's Gambit Declined – a chess opening
 KGD – an amino acid sequence that forms a Disintegrin in viper venom